Mononchulidae is a family of nematodes belonging to the order Dorylaimida.

Genera:
 Mononchulus Cobb, 1918
 Oionchus Cobb, 1913
 Rahmium Andrássy, 1973

References

Nematode families